Seymour High School is a secondary school at 2 Botsford Road in Seymour, Connecticut in the United States.

History
The town of Seymour began building its first public high school in 1884 on Bank Street. It was built on a  piece of property that the town purchased for $3,000. When the school first opened in the fall of 1886, it had 456 students, who all attended class in nine rooms. Later, the building was used as an elementary school, Center School. That building and its annex are now listed on the National Register of Historic Places.

Seymour purchased land on Pine Street (Broad Street Bridge area) in 1915. By 1916, a high school was built. After the 1955 flood the school needed major renovations. After the renovations were complete, in the 1960s, The Pine Street school was converted into a middle school and a new high school was opened on Botsford Road. In 2006, a 22 million dollar renovation was added to the high school.

Athletics

Seymour High School is part of the Naugatuck Valley League(NVL) and the Connecticut Interscholastic Athletic Conference (CIAC).

The Seymour High School Cheerleading team won the state championship in 2010 and the Division IV regional championship in 2012.

The last state title the football team won was in 2007.

The baseball team has won the state championship in 2007 and made five other appearances in the state championship.

The Wildcats Softball Team has won multiple state championships (1993, 1995, 1996, 2000, 2004, 2005, 2006, and 2009). From 2005-2007, they had a 78-game winning streak which is a Connecticut record and ranks 6th nationally all-time.  In 2004, Seymour Softball set a Connecticut state record for the most wins in a season (28). In 2006, Seymour's 31 home runs were the 8th best nationally all-time, and their 27 runs allowed was 3rd fewest nationally all-time.

The weightlifting team won a 2014 NVL Championship win.

See also
National Register of Historic Places listings in New Haven County, Connecticut

References

External links
 

Schools in New Haven County, Connecticut
Public high schools in Connecticut
Seymour, Connecticut
School buildings on the National Register of Historic Places in Connecticut
National Register of Historic Places in New Haven County, Connecticut